The flag of Azad Kashmir is a civil and state flag representing the Pakistani-administered territory of Azad Kashmir. It features a green background, four horizontal white stripes alternating with green, a star and crescent on the upper fly, and a gold canton on the upper hoist.

History 
The flag was adopted on 24 September 1975 via the Azad Jammu and Kashmir State Flag Ordinance, passed by founding President Sardar Muhammad Ibrahim Khan. It was designed in 1948 by Abdul Haq Mirza, a mujahid working at the Rawalpindi headquarters of the Azad Kashmir rebellion, as the "Kashmir Liberation Flag". Mirza also created the formation signs of the Kashmir Liberation Force.

The Azad Kashmir flag is a key symbol of identity for Azad-Kashmiris at home and in the Azad Kashmiri diaspora. It has also been associated with the Kashmir conflict.

Design
The flag symbolises various aspects of the state. According to the Azad Kashmir government, the green field represents the region's Muslim majority population; the gold canton represents the religious minorities; the white stripes represent the snow-peaked mountains of the state, and the green stripes alternating with them represent the Valley of Kashmir. The star and crescent is a national icon which also features on Pakistan's flag.

See also 
 Watan Hamara Azad Kashmir
 Flag of Jammu and Kashmir
 National flag of Pakistan 
 List of Pakistani flags

References 

Azad Kashmir
Azad Kashmir
A
Azad
Flags introduced in 1975